The Perry Fire was a wildfire that burned near Reno, Nevada. As of August 6, 2018, the fire had burned a total of 51,400 acres and was 100% contained.

On August 5, 2018 the fire was 100% contained.

Closures 
Highway 446 is closed in the area.

Evacuations 
The Grass Valley Road Area is under evacuations.

An evacuation center is open at Ironwood Event Center.

References 

2018 in Nevada
2018 Nevada wildfires